Giovanni Ceschini (active Verona, circa 1590–1640)  was an Italian painter  active in Verona. He trained under Alessandro Turchi.

References

Year of death missing
16th-century Italian painters
Italian male painters
17th-century Italian painters
Painters from Verona
Year of birth uncertain